TransGeraldton is a system of bus transport in Geraldton, Western Australia. It is part of the Public Transport Authority's TransRegional scheme, run by Path Transit which is based in Perth

Fleet
As at December 2012, the fleet consisted of 19 buses.

References

See also

Bus companies of Western Australia
Geraldton
1968 establishments in Australia